The 1996 Vuelta a España was the 51st edition of the Vuelta a España, one of cycling's Grand Tours. The Vuelta began in Valencia on 7 September, and Stage 12 occurred on 19 September with a stage from Benavente. The race finished in Madrid on 29 September.

Stage 12
19 September 1996 — Benavente to Alto del Naranco,

Stage 13
20 September 1996 — Oviedo to Lakes of Covadonga,

Stage 14
21 September 1996 — Cangas de Onís to Cabarceno Natural Park,

Stage 15
22 September 1996 —  to Alto Cruz de la Demanda (Ezcaray),

Stage 16
23 September 1996 — Logroño to Sabiñánigo,

Stage 17
24 September 1996 — Sabiñánigo to Cerler,

Stage 18
25 September 1996 — Benasque to Zaragoza,

Stage 19
26 September 1996 — Getafe to Ávila,

Stage 20
27 September 1996 — Ávila to Palazuelos de Eresma (Destilerías DYC),

Stage 21
28 September 1996 — Segovia to Palazuelos de Eresma (Destilerías DYC),  (ITT)

Stage 22
29 September 1996 — Madrid to Madrid,

References

1996 Vuelta a España
Vuelta a España stages